Alemdar Mustafa Pasha (also called Bayraktar Mustafa Pasha; born 1755, died 15 November 1808) was an Ottoman military commander and a Grand Vizier born in Hotin (modern Khotyn) in the then Ottoman territory of Ukraine in 1765. Of Albanian origin, he hailed from the village of Goskovë near Korçë). 

Both 'alemdar' and 'bayraktar' mean "the standard bearer" and were names given to the same rank in the Janissary corps.

Alemdar Mustafa Pasha is often regarded as a pioneering figure, who recognized the need for a modern army - he was instrumental in setting up the French military mission in 1796.

Early career 
He was originally the ayan (provincial notable) of Rusçuk, and one of the strongest ayans of his time. He rose to power through the Janissary corps, and, having been promoted to commandership, took part in the wars against Austria and the Russian Empire.The deposition of the reforming Sultan Selim III in 1807, and his replacement with the reactionary Mustafa IV by the Janissaries and other opponents of reform, provoked Alemdar Mustafa Pasha to lead his army of Albanians and Bosnians to Constantinople in an attempt to reinstate Selim III and restore his reforms. After Alemdar's arrival, Mustafa IV ordered the killing of Selim III and Mahmud II,  succeeding in the former case. Seeing Selim III dead, Alemdar offered fealty to Mahmud II (Selim's cousin), who was instated as sultan, with Alemdar as his grand vizier. 

As grand vizier, Alemdar purged the soldiers who had rebelled against Selim, removed conservatives from government positions and replaced them with men sympathetic to reform. He modernised the army and navy and attempted to reform the Janissaries, but Mahmud, fearing a political backlash by the elite corps, halted these changes. Alemdar's power and influence and his arrogance in wielding it caused a rebellion against him . In November 1808, the Janissaries attacked the Porte and laid siege to the stone powder magazine where he and his personal guard had taken refuge. As the Janissaries were about to break in, the powder barrels exploded, killing Alemdar, his guard, and several hundred Janissaries.

Alemdar Incident

Alemdar Mustafa Pasha had always been a keen supporter of Sultan Selim III. With Mustafa IV on the throne and rebels commanded by Kabakçı Mustafa in command of the Ottoman capital, Alemdar summoned a council in Rusçuk and decided to take action.
    
On 21 June 1808, Alemdar and his army of about 15,000 men arrived in Constantinople in an event that came to be known as the Alemdar Incident (Turkish: Alemdar Vakası). They easily took control, and Alemdar ordered the rebels to be killed or exiled.
    
After Mustafa IV learned of these events, he decided to have his uncle, Selim III, and his younger brother, Prince Mahmud, killed so that he should be the only surviving member of the imperial family. The executioners first arrived in Selim III's room in the palace. Selim III, who was playing a reed flute and had no weapons, resisted with his flute, but his efforts proved futile and he was strangled. His dead body was brought to Alemdar who wept, thinking that he had failed in all his objectives.
    
His men warned him that Mustafa IV's men planned to kill Prince Mahmud as well. The executioners had raided the prince's room, but the servants hid him on the roof. Alemdar and his men broke down the palace doors, killed the rebels and eventually saved the prince.
    
Alemdar Mustafa Pasha declared Mahmud the new sultan (Mahmud II), and became his grand vizier.

In the service of Sultan Mahmud II
But differences of opinion soon emerged between the new sultan and Alemdar. First of all, Alemdar made an agreement with the rebel representative from Anatolian lands, which was called the Charter of Alliance (Sened-i Ittifak). Sultan Mahmud thought that this agreement his authority and withdrew his support for the pasha.
    
Secondly, he re-established the army of Nizam-ı Cedid ('New Order'), calling it the Sekban-I Cedid Army. The Nizam-ı Cedid Army was a hated rival to the Janissaries so the new name has been interpreted as an effort to appease them. Furthermore, Alemdar conducted an investigation into the Janissary corps and fired men who were not actually Janissaries but receiving Janissary salaries all the same.

Death
Alemdar's measures laid the ground for later reforms in the Ottoman Empire. But meanwhile, the ruling elite resented him. On 15 November 1808, about a thousand Janissaries raided Alemdar Mustafa Pasha's house. Realising he could not survive the assault, he ignited the gunpowder reserves in the cellar of his house, killing himself and approximately 400 Janissaries in the ensuing explosion. He was buried in the courtyard of the Zeynep Sultan Mosque in Istanbul.

A street in Istanbul near the Sublime Porte is named after Alemdar Mustafa Pasha., a plaque there stating that his father was a Janissary from Ruscuk.

See also
 List of Ottoman Grand Viziers
 Ottoman military reforms
 Selim III

References 

 Shaw, S. J. and Shaw, E. Z. 1997. History of the Ottoman Empire, Volume 2. Cambridge: Cambridge University Press.
 Ortayli, I. İmparatorluğun En Uzun Yüzyılı (Longest Century of the Empire). Hil Yayinlari (1983)

1765 births
1808 deaths
People from Khotyn
Pashas
People from Ruse, Bulgaria
19th-century Grand Viziers of the Ottoman Empire
Albanian Grand Viziers of the Ottoman Empire
18th-century Albanian people
19th-century Albanian people
People from the Ottoman Empire of Albanian descent
Albanian Pashas
People from Korçë